Shettleston Football Club was a football club from Shettleston in Glasgow.

History

The club claimed a foundation date of 1880, but it did not have any recorded matches until 1883.  Shettleston entered the Scottish Cup for the first time in 1883–84, losing to Royal Albert F.C. in the first round.  The club entered every season until 1889–90, but only ever won one tie; against the original Airdrie F.C. at Coatbridge in 1884–85.  In the second round the club originally lost 9–1 at West Benhar F.C., but the Scottish Football Association ordered a replay after Shettleston protested against Benhar's "rough play". This was to no avail for Shettleston as it lost again, albeit only 4–1, at neutral ground in Airdrie in front of over a thousand spectators; the Shettleston fans "hooted and hissed tremendously" at the Benhar side.

The club reached the second round again in 1887–88, in unclear circumstances.  The club lost 4–3 at Carfin Shamrock F.C. in the first round, but was reinstated into the second, for an unknown reason; the Scottish FA also allowed Carfin to progress to the second.  As the Scottish FA heard first round protests at the same time as drawing the second round, and one of the protests was a lengthy one between two of the biggest clubs at the time (3rd Lanark Rifle Volunteers and Cowlairs F.C.) over professionalism, there may not have been enough time to make a ruling and arrange a replay.  In the second round, Shettleston lost 6–3 at Northern F.C. of Springburn, let down by insufficient teamwork.  Shamrock had beaten Shettleston in the first round in 1886–87 and Shettleston had protested about Shamrock's rough play, although the appeal was dismissed.

The club's biggest competitive win was in the first Glasgow Cup in 1887–88, winning 10–0 away at United Abstainers F.C., scoring the first after four minutes and 4 by the time a quarter of an hour had passed.  The club however lost 11–0 at Cambuslang F.C. in the second round, with goalkeeper Wilson receiving special praise for his efforts.  Shettleston had a similar set of results in the tournament in 1888–89; beating Rutherglen F.C. 9–2 but losing 11–2 at Celtic F.C., in the Bhoys' first-ever Glasgow Cup tie.

Shettleston's biggest achievements came in the North-Eastern Cup, a low-level Glaswegian tournament, albeit often consisting of no more than eight clubs.  Shettleston twice reached the semi-final, in 1883–84 and 1888–89, both times after winning one tie.

The club's final recorded match is a 7–1 first round defeat at home to the Battlefield club of south Glasgow in the 1889–90 Scottish Cup.  The two sides were drawn together again in the Glasgow Cup; Shettleston scratched before the inevitable defeat, unable to raise a team, and did not play competitive football again.

In 1890, after the club disbanded, ia new senior club, Shettleton Swifts, started up, but it does not have any links to the Shettleston club.

Colours

The club originally played in navy.  In 1884 it changed to black and white stripes, and in 1887 to red and white stripes.

Ground

The club's home ground was originally at Greenhouse Park.  In 1887 the club moved to Carntyne Park.

References

Defunct football clubs in Scotland
Association football clubs established in 1880
Association football clubs disestablished in 1889
Football in Glasgow
1880 establishments in Scotland